Dyusyanovo (Düśän) is a rural locality (a selo) in Bikkulovsky Selsoviet, Bizhbulyaksky District, Bashkortostan, Russia. The population was 413 as of 2010.

Geography 
Dyusyanovo is located 28 km south of Bizhbulyak (the district's administrative centre) by road. Aitovo is the nearest rural locality.

References 

Rural localities in Bizhbulyaksky District